The Honourable Richard Bagot (22 November 1782 – 15 May 1854) was an English bishop.

Life
Bagot was a younger son of William Bagot, 1st Baron Bagot, of Blithfield Hall, Staffordshire, by the Honourable Elizabeth Louisa St John, daughter of John St John, 2nd Viscount St John. William Bagot, 2nd Baron Bagot, and Sir Charles Bagot were his elder brothers; Bishop Lewis Bagot was his uncle.

Bagot was educated at Rugby School and Christ Church, Oxford (matriculated 1799, B.A. 1803, M.A. 1806, D.D. by diploma 1829), and in 1804 was elected to a fellowship at All Souls College, Oxford, which he resigned two years later upon his marriage.

Bagot was Rector of Leigh and Blithfield and Prebendary of Lichfield Cathedral. He was Canon of Windsor from 1822 to 1827, Dean of Canterbury 1827–1845, Bishop of Oxford 1829–1845 and Bishop of Bath and Wells 1845–1854. He was the first Bishop of Oxford to be ex officio Chancellor of the Order of the Garter (from 1837 to 1845).

Holding the see of Oxford through the early years of the Tractarian movement, the Tory Bagot, hostile to Low Church attitudes, was initially and notably sympathetic to John Henry Newman and his associates. That did change by the first years of the 1840s, and Bagot did act in particular against the preaching of Edward Pusey.

Family
Bagot married Lady Harriet Villiers, daughter of George Villiers, 4th Earl of Jersey in 1806. They had eight sons (three of whom became clergy and three joined the armed services) and four daughters:

Edward Richard Bagot, army officer
Villiers, died young in 1810
Henry Bagot R.N.
Charles Walter Bagot, cleric
Louis Francis Bagot, cleric
Harriet Frances, married 1837 Rev. Lord Charles Thynne
George Bagot, army officer
Frances Caroline, died 1840 at age 21
Richard Bagot, died 1840 at age 19
Frederick Bagot, cleric
Emily Mary (died 1853), married in 1850 the Hon.George Thomas Orlando Bridgeman, second son of George Bridgeman, 2nd Earl of Bradford
Mary Isabel, married in 1843 William Dawnay, 7th Viscount Downe.

References

1782 births
1854 deaths
People from the Borough of East Staffordshire
Younger sons of barons
People educated at Rugby School
Alumni of Christ Church, Oxford
Fellows of All Souls College, Oxford
Deans of Canterbury
Bishops of Oxford
Bishops of Bath and Wells
19th-century Church of England bishops
Canons of Windsor
Chancellors of the Order of the Garter